WPTT (1540 AM, "Party 92.9") is a radio station located in Hartford, Wisconsin, and serving the Milwaukee metropolitan area. WPTT is owned by Tomsun Media LLC, which is operated by David and Connie Stout.

WPTT is a daytime-only station that is off the air during nighttime hours because it shares the same frequency as "clear channel" station KXEL in Waterloo, Iowa.

FM Translator
The station simulcasts its signal on 92.9 FM using translator W225CP; this widens the coverage area, adds high fidelity stereophonic sound and provides 24 hours/day broadcasting.  The translator is owned by Tomsun Media, LLC.

As a full service station
WTKM began broadcasting in 1951, and also has an FM sister station at 104.9 MHz, which began broadcasting in the 1973. Both stations ran a polka and full service format for most of their existence. Most of WTKM's programming was a simulcast with the FM, although it aired separate German Language and music programming on Sunday afternoons called "The Voice Of Germany" and "The Rosary" weekday afternoons.

As Cruisin' 1540

On December 1, 2009, the AM station launched an oldies format, as "Cruisin' 1540". Cruisin' aired a mixture of 1950s-1970s oldies, including Beatles, Beach Boys, Motown and more. In 2017, a Sunday afternoon polka music show was added that had been airing on sister station WTKM-FM.

Party 92.9 FM
On September 1, 2017 at 1 p.m., WTKM signed on an FM translator at 92.9 FM, changed its call sign to WPTT, and flipped to an adult hits format leaning towards more upbeat songs as "Party 92.9".

References

External links

PTT (AM)
Radio stations established in 1951
1951 establishments in Wisconsin
PTT